St. Walburga's Academy of the Society of the Holy Child Jesus is an historic academy located at 630 Riverside Drive and 140th Street in New York City.

Construction on the Gothic Revival structure designed by architect John W. Kearney began in 1911, and in 1913 the school opened, serving as both a boarding and day school for girls. In 1957, the school relocated to Rye, New York and changed its name to the School of the Holy Child. In 1980, school was the filming location for the film, Inferno. In 1998, the building was purchased by the Fortune Society, a non-profit organization focused on helping those released from prison to transition back into society, and was restored. In April 2002, the newly named Fortune Academy opened and can house up to 62 homeless previously incarcerated individuals. On July 28, 2004, St. Walburga's Academy was added to the National Register of Historic Places.

References

School buildings on the National Register of Historic Places in Manhattan
Gothic Revival architecture in New York (state)
School buildings completed in 1911
1911 establishments in New York (state)